Elections to Eastleigh Council were held on 2 May 2002.  The whole council was up for election with boundary changes since the last election in 2000.  The Liberal Democrat party kept overall control of the council.

Election result

Ward results

External links
 BBC report of 2002 Eastleigh election result

2002
2002 English local elections
2000s in Hampshire